Ildefonso Arenas (born 1947 in Madrid) is a Spanish writer, best known for his historical novels. An IT professional by trade, Arenas achieved enormous success with his novel Álava en Waterloo, based on the exploits of Miguel Ricardo de Álava. He has published half a dozen novels, for which he typically does exhaustive historical research.

References

Spanish writers
1947 births
Living people